Harriet Hollister Spencer State Recreation Area, also known as the Harriet Hollister Spencer Memorial Recreation Area, is a  recreation area and part of the New York state park system.

History
Harriet Hollister Spencer State Recreation Area was created after  of land was given to the state from the estate of Harriet Hollister Spencer, a Rochester horticulturalist, rose expert and civic leader, after her death in 1962.

The recreation area nearly doubled in size after several adjacent parcels were purchased by New York State from The Nature Conservancy starting in the late 2000s.

Park description
Open year-round, the recreation area offers panoramic views of the countryside, including Honeoye Lake. The park has one picnic pavilion, and offers hiking, cross-country skiing, and biking trails, and hunting.

Organizational use

Because of its elevation, this recreation area gets more snow than many parks in the area, making it a regional winter sports destination.  of trails, ranging in difficulty from novice to expert, are constructed, maintained, and groomed by the Rochester Cross Country Ski Foundation. Cross-country skiing teams often use the park for practice.

The Muller Field Station near this park is utilized often by Finger Lakes Community College's conservation department in monitoring local wildlife populations and training students in valuable methods and techniques, such as imitating scent rubbing.

See also
 List of New York state parks

References

External links
 New York State Parks: Harriet Hollister Spencer State Recreation Area
 University of Rochester's collection of Harriet Hollister Spencer's papers
 Rochester Museum and Science Center's collection of Harriet Hollister Spencer's papers

State parks of New York (state)
Parks in Ontario County, New York
Protected areas established in 1962
1962 establishments in New York (state)